Dil kam No Dil (Armenian language: Դիլ կամ Նո Դիլ) is the Armenian version of the television gameshow Deal or No Deal. It premiered in November 2006, produced by Armenia TV.

The set is identical to the US version and contestants can win as small as AMD 1 (about US$0.0021) and as big as AMD 100,000,000 (about US$210,000).

Case values

External links
Official Site 

Deal or No Deal
2005 Armenian television series debuts
2005 Armenian television series endings
Armenia TV original programming